Konstantinos Tarasis (born 10 November 1957) is a retired Greek football defender and later manager.

Personal

Tarasis hails from Oinoussa, Serres.

His daughter Mary (1980-2022) was a handball player and coach. She died by cancer on 6 November 2022.

References

1957 births
Living people
Greek footballers
Panserraikos F.C. players
Panathinaikos F.C. players
Aris Thessaloniki F.C. players
Greece international footballers
Super League Greece players
Association football defenders
Greek football managers
Panserraikos F.C. managers
Panathinaikos F.C. non-playing staff